This is a list of rural localities in Dagestan. Dagestan, officially the Republic of Dagestan, is a federal subject (a republic) of Russia, located in the North Caucasus region. Its capital and largest city is Makhachkala, centrally located on the Caspian Sea coast. Dagestan has a population of 2,910,249.

Agulsky District 
Rural localities in Agulsky District:

 Amukh
 Arsug
 Bedyuk
 Burkikhan
 Burshag
 Chirag
 Duldug
 Fite
 Goa
 Khudig
 Khutkhul
 Kurag
 Richa
 Shari
 Tpig
 Tsirkhe
 Yarkug

Akhtynsky District 
Rural localities in Akhtynsky District:

 Akhty
 Dzhaba
 Fiy
 Gdym
 Gdynk
 Kaka
 Kaluk
 Khkem
 Khnov
 Khryug
 Lutkun
 Midzhakh
 Novy Usur
 Ukhul
 Yalak
 Zrykh

Akhvakhsky District 
Rural localities in Akhvakhsky District:

 Anchik
 Archo
 Ingerdakh
 Izano
 Karata
 Kudiyabroso
 Lologonitel
 Mashtada
 Mesterukh
 Rachabulda
 Ratsitl
 Tad-Magitl
 Tlibisho
 Tlisi
 Tsoloda
 Tukita
 Verkhneye Inkhelo

Akushinsky District 
Rural localities in Akushinsky District:

 Akhsakadamakhi
 Akusha
 Alikhanmakhi
 Ameterkmakhi
 Aynikabmakhi
 Balkhar
 Bikalamakhi
 Bukkamakhi
 Burgimakmakhi
 Butri
 Chankalamakhi
 Chinimakhi
 Dubrimakhi
 Gapshima
 Geba
 Gerkhmakhi
 Ginta
 Giyagaramakhi
 Gulebki
 Gumramakhi
 Gunnamakhi
 Inzimakhi
 Kaddamakhi
 Kakmakhi
 Kamkadamakhi
 Karsha
 Kassagumakhi
 Kavkamakhi
 Kertukmakhi
 Khazhnimakhi
 Kubrimakhi
 Kuli
 Kuliyamakhi
 Kurimakhi
 Kurkimakhi
 Mugi
 Murlatinamakhi
 Nakhi
 Natsi
 Nizhniye Karshli
 Nizhny Chiamakhi
 Semgamakhi
 Shinkbalakada
 Shukty
 Tanty
 Tebekmakhi
 Tserkhimakhi
 Tsugni
 Tsulikana
 Tsundimakhi
 Tsunimakhi
 Tuzlamakhi
 Ulluchara
 Urgani
 Urgubamakhi
 Urkhuchimakhi
 Urzhagimakhi
 Usisha
 Utsilimakhi
 Uznimakhi
 Verkhniye Mulebki
 Verkhny Chiamakhi
 Yaraymakhi
 Zilmukmakhi

Babayurtovsky District 
Rural localities in Babayurtovsky District:

 Adil-Yangiyurt
 Alimpashayurt
 Babayurt
 Chankayurt
 Gemetyube
 Germenchik
 Khamamatyurt
 Khasanay
 Lyuksemburg
 Muzhukay
 Novaya Kosa
 Novokare
 Sovetskoye
 Tamazatyube
 Tamazatyube Staroye
 Tatayurt
 Turshunay
 Utsmiyurt
 Yangylbay

Botlikhsky District 
Rural localities in Botlikhsky District:

 Alak
 Andi
 Ankho
 Ansalta
 Ashali
 Ashino
 Beledi
 Botlikh
 Godoberi
 Gunkha
 Khando
 Kheleturi
 Kizhani
 Miarso
 Muni
 Nizhneye Inkhelo
 Rakhata
 Rushukha
 Shivor
 Shodroda
 Tando
 Tasuta
 Tlokh
 Zibirkhali
 Zilo

Buynaksky District 
Rural localities in Buynaksky District:

 Agachkala
 Akaytala
 Apshi
 Arkas
 Atlanaul
 Buglen
 Chabanmakhi
 Chankurbe
 Chirkey
 Durangi
 Ekibulak
 Erpeli
 Gergentala
 Kachkalyk
 Kadar
 Kafyr-Kumukh
 Karamakhi
 Khalimbekaul
 Manasaul
 Nizhneye Ishkarty
 Nizhneye Kazanishche
 Nizhny Dzhengutay
 Nizhny Karanay
 Takalay
 Vanashimakhi
 Verkhneye Ishkarty
 Verkhneye Kazanishche
 Verkhny Dzhengutay
 Verkhny Karanay

Charodinsky District 
Rural localities in Charodinsky District:

 Archib
 Tsurib

Dakhadayevsky District 
Rural localities in Dakhadayevsky District:

 Ashty
 Ayatsimakhi
 Ayatsuri
 Bakni
 Buskri
 Butulta
 Chishili
 Dibgalik
 Dibgashi
 Duakar
 Dzhurmachi
 Dzilebki
 Guladty
 Gunakari
 Iragi
 Iraki
 Itsari
 Kalkni
 Karkatsi
 Kharbuk
 Khuduts
 Khurshni
 Kishcha
 Kudagu
 Kunki
 Meusisha
 Morskoye
 Mukrakari
 Novy Urkarakh
 Shadni
 Shalasi
 Shari
 Sumiya
 Sutbuk
 Trisanchi
 Tsizgari
 Tsurai
 Uragi
 Urari
 Urkarakh
 Urkhnishcha
 Urtsaki
 Zilbachi
 Zubanchi

Derbentsky District 
Rural localities in Derbentsky District:

 Aglobi
 Andreyevka
 Arablinskoye
 Belidzhi
 Berikey
 Bilgadi
 Chinar
 Delichoban
 Dzhalgan
 Dzhemikent
 Gedzhukh
 Kala
 Karadagly
 Karadagly
 Kullar
 Mitagi
 Mitagi-Kazmalyar
 Mugarty
 Muzaim
 Nizhny Dzhalgan
 Nyugdi
 Padar
 Rubas
 Rukel
 Sabnova
 Salik
 Tatlyar
 Ullu-Terkeme
 Vavilovo
 Velikent
 Yuny Pakhar
 Zidyan-Kazmalyar

Dokuzparinsky District 
Rural localities in Dokuzparinsky District:

 Avadan
 Demirar
 Esetar
 Gandurar
 Kaladzhukh
 Karakyure
 Kavalar
 Kerimkhanar
 Kiler
 Mikrakh
 Miskindzha
 Novoye Karakyure
 Tekipirkent
 Usukhchay

Gergebilsky District 
Rural localities in Gergebilsky District:

 Akushali
 Aymaki
 Chalda
 Darada
 Gergebil
 Gotsob
 Iputa
 Khvarada
 Khvartikuni
 Kikuni
 Kudutl
 Kurmi
 Maali
 Mogokh
 Murada
 Tunzi

Gumbetovsky District 
Rural localities in Gumbetovsky District:

 Argvani
 Chirkata
 Chitl
 Danukh
 Gadari
 Ichichali
 Igali
 Ingishi
 Kilyatl
 Kunzakh
 Mekhelta
 Narysh
 Nizhneye Inkho
 Nizhny Aradirikh
 Novoye Argvani
 Shabdukh
 Sredny Aradirikh
 Tantari
 Tlyarata
 Tsanatl
 Tsundi
 Verkhneye Inkho
 Verkhny Aradirikh

Gunibsky District 
Rural localities in Gunibsky District:

 Agada
 Ala
 Amuarib
 Balanub
 Batsada
 Bolshoy Urala
 Bukhty
 Chokh
 Chonob
 Egeda
 Enseruda
 Gonoda
 Gunib
 Ivaylazda
 Karadakh
 Keger
 Khamagib
 Khatsunob
 Khindakh
 Khopor
 Khotoch
 Kommuna
 Koroda
 Kulla
 Lakhchayda
 Maly Urala
 Megeb
 Mugdab
 Nakazukh
 Nizhny Keger
 Obokh
 Obonub
 Rosutl
 Rugudzha
 Salta
 Sekh
 Shangoda
 Shulani
 Silta
 Sogratl
 Tlogob
 Tsalada
 Unkida
 Unty
 Urala

Karabudakhkentsky District 
Rural localities in Karabudakhkentsky District:

 Adanak
 Agachaul
 Dorgeli
 Dzhanga
 Geli
 Gubden
 Gurbuki
 Kakamakhi
 Karabudakhkent
 Leninkent
 Manaskent
 Paraul
 Siragi
 Ullubiyaul
 Zelenomorsk

Kayakentsky District 
Rural localities in Kayakentsky District:

 Alkhadzhakent
 Bashlykent
 Deybuk
 Druzhba
 Dzhavankent
 Gasha
 Gerga
 Inchkhe
 Kapkaykent
 Karanayaul
 Kayakent
 Kulkam
 Novokayakent
 Novye Vikri
 Pervomayskoye
 Sagasi-Deybuk
 Usemikent
 Utamysh

Kaytagsky District 
Rural localities in Kaytagsky District:

 Adaga
 Akhmedkent
 Barshamay
 Bazhluk
 Chakhdikna
 Chumli
 Daknisa
 Duregi
 Dzhavgat
 Dzhibakhni
 Dzhigiya
 Dzhinabi
 Dzhirabachi
 Gaziya
 Guldy
 Gulli
 Karatsan
 Kartalay
 Khadagi
 Khungiya
 Kirki
 Kirtsik
 Kulegu
 Kulidzha
 Lishcha
 Madzhalis
 Mallakent
 Mizhigli
 Novaya Barsha
 Pilyaki
 Rodnikovy
 Ruka
 Sanchi
 Shilansha
 Shilyagi
 Shuragat
 Surgiya
 Surkhachi
 Surkhavkent
 Turaga
 Varsit
 Yangikent

Kazbekovsky District 
Rural localities in Kazbekovsky District:

 Akhsu
 Almak
 Artlukh
 Burtunay
 Dylym
 Gertma
 Gostala
 Guni
 Ikha
 Imanaliroso
 Inchkha
 Kalininaul
 Khubar
 Leninaul

Khasavyurtovsky District 
Rural localities in Khasavyurtovsky District:

 Abdurashid
 Adilotar
 Adzhimazhagatyurt
 Akbulatyurt
 Aksay
 Bammatyurt
 Batashyurt
 Batayurt
 Bayram
 Bayramaul
 Boragangechuv
 Chagarotar
 Dzerzhinskoye
 Genzheaul
 Goksuv
 Kadyrotar
 Kandauraul
 Karlanyurt
 Kazmaaul
 Kemsiyurt
 Khamavyurt
 Kokrek
 Kurush
 Laklakyurt
 Mogilyovskoye
 Moksob
 Mutsalaul
 Novogagatli
 Novoselskoye
 Novosositli
 Novy Kostek
 Nuradilovo
 Oktyabrskoye
 Osmanyurt
 Pervomayskoye
 Petrakovskoye
 Pokrovskoye
 Pyatiletka
 Sadovoye
 Shagada
 Simsir
 Siukh
 Solnechnoye
 Sovetskoye
 Sulevkent
 Temiraul
 Terechnoye
 Toturbiykala
 Tshiyab Ichichali
 Tukita
 Tutlar
 Umarotar
 Umashaul

Khivsky District 
Rural localities in Khivsky District:

 Archug
 Asakent
 Ashaga-Arkhit
 Ashaga-Tsinit
 Ashaga-Yarak
 Chilikar
 Dardarkent
 Furdag
 Garig
 Khiv
 Khursatil
 Kondik
 Kug
 Kulig
 Kushtil
 Kuvig
 Lyakhlya
 Trkal
 Tslak
 Tsuduk
 Urtil
 Vertil
 Yargil
 Yukhari-Arkhit
 Yukhari-Yarak
 Zakhit
 Zaza
 Zildik

Khunzakhsky District 
Rural localities in Khunzakhsky District:

 Khunzakh

Kizilyurtovsky District 
Rural localities in Kizilyurtovsky District:

 Aknada
 Chontaul
 Gelbakh
 Kirovaul
 Komsomolskoye
 Kulzeb
 Matseyevka
 Miatli
 Nechayevka
 Nizhny Chiryurt
 Novoye Gadari
 Novy Chirkey
 Shushanovka
 Stalskoye
 Zubutli-Miatli

Kizlyarsky District 
Rural localities in Kizlyarsky District:

 Aleksandriyskaya
 Averyanovka
 Bolshaya Areshevka
 Bolshekozyrevskoye
 Bondarevskoye
 Bryansk
 Bryansky Rybzavod
 Burumbay
 Chernyayevka
 Dagestanskoye
 Gruzinskoye
 Kardonovka
 Kerlikent
 Khutseyevka
 Kokhanovskoye
 Kollektivizator
 Kosyakino
 Krasnooktyabrskoye
 Krasnoye
 Krasny Voskhod
 Kraynovka
 Kurdyukovskoye
 Makarovskoye
 Malaya Areshevka
 Mirnoye
 Mulla-Ali
 Nekrasovka
 Novaya Serebryakovka
 Novogladovka
 Novokokhanovskoye
 Novokrestyanovskoye
 Novomonastyrskoye
 Novonadezhdovka
 Novovladimirskoye
 Novy Biryuzyak
 Novy Chechen
 Oguzer
 Oktyabrskoye
 Persidskoye
 Pervokizlyarskoye
 Pervomayskoye
 Prigorodnoye
 Rechnoye
 Rybalko
 Sangishi
 Sar-Sar
 Selo imeni Karla Marksa
 Selo imeni Kirova
 Selo imeni Shaumyana
 Selo imeni Zhdanova
 Shkolnoye
 Suyutkino
 Tsvetkovka
 Tushilovka
 Ukrainskoye
 Vperyod
 Vyshe-Talovka
 Yasnaya Polyana
 Yefimovka
 Yubileynoye
 Yuzhnoye
 Zarechnoye
 Zarya Komunny

Kulinsky District 
Rural localities in Kulinsky District:

 Kani
 Kaya
 Khosrekh
 Kuli
 Sukiyakh
 Sumbatl
 Tsovkra-1
 Tsovkra-2
 Tsysha
 Vachi
 Vikhli

Kumtorkalinsky District 
Rural localities in Kumtorkalinsky District:

 Almalo
 Ardzhidada
 Dakhadayevka
 Korkmaskala
 Temirgoye
 Uchkent

Kurakhsky District 
Rural localities in Kurakhsky District:

 Ashakent
 Aladash
 Arablyar
 Ashakent
 Ashar
 Bakhtsug
 Gelkhen
 Ikra
 Kabir
 Khpedzh
 Khpyuk
 Khveredzh
 Khyurekhyur
 Kochkhyur
 Kukvaz
 Kumuk
 Kurakh
 Kutul
 Kvardal
 Mollakent
 Rugun
 Shimikhyur
 Shtul
 Ukuz
 Ursun
 Usug

Laksky District 
Rural localities in Laksky District:

 Arussi
 Bagikla
 Burshi
 Chitur
 Chukna
 Churtakh
 Govkra
 Gushchi
 Guymi
 Inisha
 Kamakhal
 Kara
 Karasha
 Khulisma
 Khuna
 Khuri
 Khurkhi
 Khurukra
 Kuba
 Kubra
 Kukni
 Kulushats
 Kuma
 Kumukh
 Kundakh
 Kundy
 Kurkli
 Kurla
 Lakhir
 Luguvalu
 Mukar
 Sangar
 Shakhuva
 Shara
 Shovkra
 Shuni
 Tulizma
 Ubra
 Unchukatl
 Uri

Levashinsky District 
Rural localities in Levashinsky District:

 Akhkent
 Allate
 Amalte
 Ayalakab
 Aynikab
 Buanzimakhi
 Burtanimakhi
 Chakhimakhi
 Chuni
 Damkulakada
 Ditunshimakhi
 Dzhangamakhi
 Ebdalaya
 Elakatmakhi
 Gurgumakhi
 Inkuchimakhi
 Irgali
 Kakamakhi
 Karekadani
 Karlabko
 Khadzhalmakhi
 Khakhita
 Khasakent
 Kulemtsa
 Kulibukhna
 Kumamakhi
 Kundurkhe
 Kuppa
 Kutisha
 Levashi
 Mekegi
 Musultemakhi
 Naskent
 Nizhneye Chugli
 Nizhneye Labkomakhi
 Nizhny Arshi
 Nizhny Ubekimakhi
 Okhli
 Orada Chugli
 Purrimakhi
 Suleybakent
 Susakent
 Tagirkent
 Tarlankak
 Tarlimakhi
 Tashkapur
 Tsudakhar
 Tsukhta
 Ulluaya
 Urma
 Verkhneye Labkomakhi
 Verkhny Arshi
 Verkhny Ubekimakhi
 Zurilaudimakhi

Magaramkentsky District 
Rural localities in Magaramkentsky District:

 Azadogly
 Bilbil-Kazmalyar
 But-Kazmalyar
 Chakhchakh-Kazmalyar
 Dzhepel
 Filya
 Gaptsakh
 Garakh
 Gilyar
 Kabir-Kazmalyar
 Kartas-Kazmalyar
 Kchun-Kazmalyar
 Khodzha-Kazmalyar
 Khorel
 Khtun-Kazmalyar
 Kirka
 Kuysun
 Magaramkent
 Maka-Kazmalyar
 Novy Aul
 Oruzhba
 Primorsky
 Sovetskoye
 Tagirkent-Kazmalyar
 Tagirkent
 Tselyagyun
 Yarukvalar

Nogaysky District 
Rural localities in Nogaysky District:

 Batyr-Murza
 Boranchi
 Chervlyonnye Buruny
 Edige
 Kalininaul
 Karagas
 Karasu
 Leninaul
 Nariman
 Oratyube
 Sulutyube
 Terekli-Mekteb
 Uy-Salgan

Novolaksky District 
Rural localities in Novolaksky District:

 Banayurt
 Barchkhoyotar
 Chapayevo
 Charavali
 Gamiyakh
 Novochurtakh
 Novokuli
 Novolakskoye
 Novomekhelta
 Tukhchar
 Yamansu
 Zoriotar

Rutulsky District 
Rural localities in Rutulsky District:

 Amsar
 Arakul
 Aran
 Dzhilikhur
 Gelmets
 Ikhrek
 Kala
 Kalyal
 Khiyakh
 Khlyut
 Khnyukh
 Kiche
 Kina
 Korsh
 Kufa
 Kurdul
 Kusur
 Mikik
 Mishlesh
 Mukhakh
 Muslakh
 Myukhrek
 Nizhny Katrukh
 Ottal
 Rutul
 Syugut
 Tsakhur
 Verkhny Katrukh
 Vrush

Sergokalinsky District 
Rural localities in Sergokalinsky District:

 Arachanamakhi
 Ayalizimakhi
 Aymaumakhi
 Aynurbimakhi
 Bakhmakhi
 Baltamakhi
 Burdeki
 Burkhimakhi
 Chabazimakhi
 Degva
 Kadirkent
 Kanasiragi
 Khabkaymakhi
 Miglakasimakhi
 Murguk
 Myurego
 Nizhneye Makhargimakhi
 Nizhneye Mulebki
 Novoye Mugri
 Sergokala
 Tsurmakhi
 Urakhi
 Vanashimakhi

Shamilsky District 
Rural localities in Shamilsky District:

 Khebda
 Urib

Suleyman-Stalsky District 
Rural localities in Suleyman-Stalsky District:

 2nd otdelenie sovkhoza
 Alkadar
 Asalikent
 Ashaga-Stal
 Ashagakartas
 Butkent
 Chukhverkent
 Ekendil
 Eminkhyur
 Ichin
 Ispik
 Kachalkent
 Kakhtsug
 Karchag
 Kasumkent
 Khpyuk
 Khtun
 Kurkent
 Novaya Maka
 Nyutyug
 Orta-Stal
 Piperkent
 Ptikent
 Saidkent
 Salyan
 Sardarkent
 Saytarkent
 Shikhikent
 Tatarkhankent
 Tsmur
 Ullugatag
 Yukhari-Stal
 Yukharikartas
 Zizik
 Zukhrabkent

Tabasaransky District 
Rural localities in Tabasaransky District:

 Afna
 Akka
 Arak
 Arkit
 Bukhnag
 Burgankent
 Chulat
 Churdaf
 Dagni
 Darvag
 Dyubek
 Dzhugdil
 Dzhuldzhag
 Dzhuli
 Firgil
 Gasik
 Gelinbatan
 Gisik
 Gumi
 Gurik
 Gurkhun
 Guvlig
 Gyugryag
 Khalag
 Khanag
 Khanak
 Khapil
 Kharag
 Kharkhni
 Kheli
 Khuchni
 Khurik
 Khustil
 Khyuryak
 Kulif
 Kurkak
 Kuvag
 Kuzhnik
 Kyurek
 Kyuryag
 Lidzhe
 Lyakhe
 Maraga
 Nichras
 Novoye Lidzhe
 Pendzhi
 Pilig
 Rugudzh
 Rushchul
 Sertil
 Shile
 Sika
 Sikukh
 Sirtich
 Tatil
 Tinit
 Tsanak
 Tsantil
 Tsukhdyg
 Tsurtil
 Turag
 Turuf
 Uluz
 Urzig
 Ushnyug
 Vechrik
 Yagdyg
 Yekrag
 Yergyunyag
 Yersi
 Yurgulig

Tarumovsky District 
Rural localities in Tarumovsky District:

 Alexandro-Nevskoye
 Imunny
 Kalinovka
 Karabakhli
 Kochubey
 Koktyubey
 Kuybyshevo
 Kuznetsovskoye
 Novodmitriyevka
 Novogeorgiyevka
 Novonikolayevka
 Novoromanovka
 Plodopitomnik
 Privolny
 Rassvet
 Razdolye
 Selo imeni M. Gorkogo
 Talovka
 Tarumovka
 Vyshetalovsky
 Yurkovka

Tlyaratinsky District 
Rural localities in Tlyaratinsky District:

 Anada
 Antsukh
 Barnab
 Betelda
 Bezhuda
 Bochokh
 Chadakolob
 Childa
 Chododa
 Choroda
 Gagar
 Garakolob
 Gebguda
 Gendukh
 Genekolob
 Gerel
 Gindib
 Gortnob
 Gvedysh
 Ibragimotar
 Kamilukh
 Karadla
 Kardib
 Katroso
 Khadakolob
 Khadiyal
 Khamar
 Kharada
 Khidib
 Khindakh
 Khintida
 Khobokh
 Khoroda
 Khorta
 Khotlob
 Kishdatl
 Kolob
 Kosob
 Kutlab
 Landa
 Machar
 Magitl
 Mazada
 Nachada
 Nadar
 Nikar
 Niklida
 Nitilsukh
 Noyrukh
 Nukhotkolob
 Rosnob
 Rosta
 Salda
 Saniorta
 Santa
 Sikar
 Talsukh
 Tamuda
 Tilutl
 Tinchuda
 Tlobzoda
 Tlyanada
 Tlyarata
 Tokh
 Tokh-Orda
 Tokhota
 Tsimguda
 Tsumilukh
 Ukal
 Ulgeb
 Zhazhada

Tsumadinsky District 
Rural localities in Tsumadinsky District:

 Agvali
 Kedy
 Sildi

Tsuntinsky District 
Rural localities in Tsuntinsky District:

 Kidero
 Tsunta

Untsukulsky District 
Rural localities in Untsukulsky District:

 Arakani
 Ashilta
 Balakhani
 Betli
 Gimry
 Inkvalita
 Irganay
 Ishtiburi
 Kakhabroso
 Kharachi
 Kolob
 Maydanskoye
 Moksokh
 Tsatanikh
 Untsukul
 Zirani

See also 
 
 Lists of rural localities in Russia

References 

Dagestan